Johnny Quick is a Golden Age DC Comics character with the power of superhuman speed. The character first appeared in More Fun Comics #71 (September 1941). After his More Fun run ended in issue #107 (January-February 1946), he was moved to Adventure Comics with issue #103 (April 1946). He remained as a regular feature in Adventure until issue #207 (December 1954).

In the 1980s Johnny Quick's adventures were reconnected into the reality of DC Comics' Earth-Two; this was done in the pages of the comic book the All-Star Squadron.

Publication history
 More Fun Comics #71 (September 1941): Character debuts and appears monthly until issue #107 (January–February 1946).
 Adventure Comics #103 (April 1946): Johnny Quick's adventures continue until issue #207 (December 1954).
 DC Special Series #11 (1978): First appearance in the modern era (the last major character from More Fun Comics to be revived since the start of the Silver Age of Comic Books).
 All-Star Squadron (1982–1987): retconned into DC's "new" Earth-Two "Mystery Men" group; stories take place during the first months of America's entry into World War II.
 Young All-Stars (1987–1989): plays a supporting role in these post-Crisis on Infinite Earths World War II stories. 
 Justice Society of America (1992–1993): post-Crisis introduction of Johnny Quick into modern times; not clear if he was made a member by this time, or had honorary status.

Fictional character biography

Origin
Johnny Quick is in truth Mr. Johnny Chambers, a newsreel photographer for Sees-All/Tells-All News. He invokes his power by reciting a mathematical formula ("3X2(9YZ)4A") taught to him by his childhood guardian, Professor Gill, who had in turn derived it from inscriptions found in a Pharaoh's tomb. After learning the secret to gaining superhuman speed, Johnny chooses to work as a mystery-man.

According to Jess Nevins' Encyclopedia of Golden Age Superheroes, "his Rogues Gallery includes the armored robot Black Knight, Mr. Douglas (the Wizard of Weapons), the crime scientist Dr. Clever (who owns a lamp which grants super-speed), the Maestro of Murder, Mason the Weapons Master, the gimmick-wielding Mr. Zero, and the Human Bird, who impersonates Johnny Quick".

Early history
In 1941 Johnny Chambers puts on his scarlet uniform for the first time. He works alone at first and then gains the help of his friend and newsreel assistant Tubby Watts. December of that same year, however, proves a turning point in Johnny's life. While on assignment in Los Angeles, California, he is one of the last people to see the Flash before that mystery-man's kidnapping at the behest of the time-travelling villain Per Degaton. Due to the time paradoxes inherent in Dr. Zee's 1947 technology, the events of that first week of December, any and all which surround the villain's intrusion from the future, become undone to one extent or another when Degaton returns to the future. Though Johnny Chambers loses his memory of the details of that week (along with the other heroes and Degaton himself), in the end he goes from lone mystery-man to member of President Roosevelt's All-Star Squadron.

That pivotal adventure began with Johnny following the trail of the disappearing JSA members. He makes his way to Washington, D.C. and encounters, for the first time, Miss Libby Lawrence. As Johnny Quick he meets Liberty Belle, Plastic Man, Dr. Mid-Nite, the Hawkman, Robotman, and the Atom, and with these heroes meets with President Roosevelt. They are told of the Japanese attack on the American Fleet at Pearl Harbor. President Roosevelt announces to this handful his desire that the Justice Society of America mobilize all American costumed heroes into a single unit, an All-Star Squadron, responsible directly to the President. Their first mission is to fly to the west coast and search out any saboteurs and hopefully prevent any Japanese attack on the US mainland.

That very same day Johnny helps save San Francisco as well as the town of Monterey from Degaton's hypnotized Japanese pilots and their fearsome Zeroes. He also helps his comrades while in Degaton's super-submarine (before it winked out of existence). The assembled heroes then use their unique powers to travel to Hawaii and see the terrible consequences of the attack on Pearl Harbor. They also see firsthand the supernatural effects of the Spear of Destiny and Holy Grail, and learn that even "super" men can become manipulated by magic. The Axis now has an invisible barrier about their tactical fronts that will snare any magical mystery-man and cause them to fight for tyranny.

As for Johnny and Libby, from their first meeting the tension between them is evident as they immediately enter into a flirtatious relationship. The relationship endures many hardships in the next few months especially when Libby takes on responsibilities as Chairwoman of the Squadron after being voted in by secret ballot, but nonetheless the relationship perseveres and the two wed on April 1, 1942.

In those first few months of the All-Stars Johnny and the Squadron are actively involved with President Roosevelt and the visiting Prime Minister of the United Kingdom, Winston Churchill. Johnny not only protects Churchill from Nazis, the super-Nazi called Baron Blitzkrieg, and from brain-washed POWs (in the form of Commander Steel), he too saves the Statue of Liberty and the National Monument from attacks by Nazi sympathizers. He also travels to the Yucatán, Mexico, in the days before Christmas in order to help Carter Hall rescue his fiancée Miss Shiera Sanders. There, too, they fight Nazis and Mexican Nazi sympathizers.

Early January finds Johnny present when an eye-shaped craft flies over Washington D.C. From it there materializes a tall being who claims to be Akhet, an alien and representative of the space-faring Binary Brotherhood. This is all a trick orchestrated by Hath-Set (in his reincarnated identity of Dr. Anton Hastor). This "alien" and alien ship appear over various cities and locations the world over and the message is always the same: All Earth's nations must surrender to Akhet, as emissary of the Brotherhood. All who resist will be obliterated. For a brief moment in the history of the terrible World War, all the leaders become united against a common threat. Hitler, Mussolini, and Tojo all send word to Roosevelt and Churchill that they are ready to join in common defense against the alien. This union never comes about, however, for various heroes of the All-Star Squadron are able to discover the deception and defeat Hath-Set.

In early February the members of the disbanded JSA are missing again. An emergency meeting of the All-Stars is called and the Tarantula is invited for the first time. The meeting is interrupted by an attack by a crazed 'Fairytales' Fenton and after he is dealt with, the All-Stars head over to the grounds of the 1939 New York World's Fair where a mysterious threat is being broadcast in Morse Code. This results in the All-Stars meeting, for the first time in combat, the Brain Wave. Within the Perisphere the group find the comatose bodies of the JSAers and are given an ultimatum – enter into the dream world crafted by the villain and save the heroes from within, or else be killed. Johnny and company enter into the dreamscape but they fail as quickly as did the JSAers. Only the timely intervention of the Green Lantern saves the heroes and destroys the dream machine. After Brain Wave's defeat the group chooses the Perisphere and Trylon as their new HQ.

This adventure quickly leads into the next as Johnny finds himself with Danette Reilly when they are attacked by the man calling himself the Cyclotron, but Johnny can't keep Danette from being kidnapped. He joins with Robotman and Commander Steel and soon they discover that the Cyclotron is only a minion of the Ultra-Humanite. After yet another battle, Robotman is taken captive. In his civilian identity, Johnny is present at the Carole Lombard Memorial War Bond Drive in Manhattan. It just so happens that that is the site of the Ultra-Humanite's next attack. Though he saves numerous lives, he also suffers grave injuries and is taken to the hospital. After leaving the hospital early, he makes his way to the Perisphere and meets up with a small group of mystery-men, including the Flash. The All-Stars have already traveled to three separate cities in danger of disaster at the hands of the Ultra-Humanite: Brooklyn, Detroit, Los Angeles, and suffered various defeats. Johnny joins with the groups and together they defeat the villain.

Note: Any reference in the pages of the All-Star Squadron to Earth-Two heroes such as Superman, Batman and Wonder Woman cannot be canon in the post-Crisis universe, and the engagement of the time-traveling Earth-Two Infinity Inc. in these events is now highly confused as well. Suffice it to say, the Ultra-Humanite had minions and the minions lost.

Johnny Quick & Quicksilver
During the war Johnny meets other speedsters, the Flash and Quicksilver (Max Mercury). Quicksilver becomes a mentor for Johnny, though the hotheaded Johnny does not always take his advice easily. In 1948 Quicksilver disappears and in the 1950s Johnny retires (for the most part) as a mystery-man. In the 1960s, however, Quicksilver reappears and saves Johnny from Savitar. The two together fight the villain with Quicksilver and Savitar disappearing in a flash of light and neither reappearing for decades. Johnny, for his part, rarely puts on his speedster's uniform after that and concentrates on other aspects of his life.

Later history
In the 1950s, after committing to retirement, Johnny begins research on the formula that unlocks his speed. Quicksilver had told him that the formula was merely his way of tapping into the other-dimensional power known as the Speed Force. Scientists balk at the idea that the formula gives him power, and theorize that the power was genetic. Neither theory convinces Johnny, and he seeks his conclusions in the mystic arts, seeing the formula as a mantra, unlocking his potential.

This theory had an effect on Johnny, as he began lecturing at universities and delivering seminars, trying to preach this newfound philosophy to the world. To achieve this goal he founded Quickstart Enterprises, which created and endorsed products of potential-unlocking quality, as well as videotapes of Johnny's lectures. This led to his wife, Libby, leaving him, embarrassed.

Thanks to his abilities, Johnny's age was retarded, keeping his appearance younger and vigorous, despite his true age. After the Justice Society of America returned following a long absence, Johnny assisted them occasionally. Together with the Justice Society, Johnny would face the villain Extant during the time-event known as Zero Hour. Like the other heroes present, Johnny was aged considerably by the villain. Though he was now much older physically, he did not relinquish his hero-ing activities, and together with his daughter (now calling herself Jesse Quick) helped train the time-displaced Impulse.

Ultimate fate
Some time afterwards, Johnny meets with Iris Allen, widow of Barry Allen, who warns him that trouble was forthcoming for users of the Speed Force. Johnny refuses to believe his power was not his own, till moments later he finds himself without his speed, thanks to the manipulations of the returned Savitar. Johnny is grudgingly forced to accept the Speed Force's existence.

In the final battle with Savitar, Johnny Quick sacrifices himself to save his daughter's life and runs into the Speed Force, merging with it. In "Infinite Crisis" #4, he assists Max Mercury and Bart Allen in confining the murderous Superboy-Prime by taking the villain into and past the Speed Force.

Due to Professor Zoom's recent tamperings with the Speed Force, Johnny Quick is later seen by his daughter, Jesse and her husband, the current Hourman begging Barry Allen to spare Jesse's life. It's then revealed that Professor Zoom altered the Speed Force and Barry to make the Silver Age Flash shift in reverse, and cursed to kill every Speed Force user with a single touch. Zoom forces Johnny into touching Barry, making the former decay and crumble to dust in mere seconds. His daughter Jesse taking the mantle of Johnny's costume, while Wally West uses his connection to the Speed Force to rejuvenate the speedsters and, in the process, repair Jesse's suits.

In the solicited tie-in Blackest Night storyline, Johnny was reanimated as a member of the Black Lantern Corps. The scene where Liberty Belle is found by her father, Johnny Quick, who claims that Jesse's love for her father was the reason he came back. Jesse says that she has a uniform like his and quickly changes into it by reciting the mathematical formula that her father originally used and calls herself Jesse Quick. The two speedsters then run off. While, across the globe, Jesse Quick is running with her father Black Lantern Johnny Quick trying to enjoy the time she's spending with her father, while thinking that she must be with her husband, the modern-day Hourman. Jesse continues to run with her father, remembering her childhood memories of when they used to jog together around their neighborhood and Johnny would let her win, feeling thankful that she was able to spend only a few moments. Mr. Terrific had managed to create a one-time use machine which destroys all the Black Lanterns in New York city, Johnny included.

DC Universe
In the pages of Dark Nights: Death Metal, Johnny Quick was shown among the heroes entombed at the Valhalla Cemetery. Batman later revived him with a Black Lantern Ring.

Allies
Johnny Chambers had as his trusty assistant and confidant Tubby Watts (also of See-All-Tell-All News). He worked with, romanced and married Libby Lawrence aka Liberty Belle, and he also worked with all the members of the Wartime All-Star Squadron. During his time with the Squadron, Johnny met the members of the JSA and developed a strong but friendly rivalry with Jay Garrick, the first Flash.

Johnny Quick reappeared briefly during the Infinite Crisis storyline with Max Mercury and Barry Allen to assist Bart Allen (the second Kid Flash) wrestle Superboy-Prime into the Speed Force.

References

External links
Johnny Quick entry on DCDatabaseProject
Johnny Quick in the Toonopedia

Golden Age superheroes
Earth-Two
Comics characters introduced in 1941
DC Comics superheroes
DC Comics male superheroes
DC Comics characters who can move at superhuman speeds
DC Comics metahumans
Characters created by Mort Weisinger
Fictional photographers
Flash (comics) characters